Revolution (Romanian: Revolușn) was a summer music festival which is held in the city of Timișoara, Romania.

The festival was founded in 2015 in Timișoara as a part of the EXIT Festival's EXIT Adventure package, which also contained EXIT and Sea Dance Festivals. The first edition of the festival was held from 30 to 31 May in Timișoara, and it attracted 12,000 visitors.

History 
The festival began in 2015 as a part of the EXIT Festival's EXIT Adventure package. During its existence, Revolution has been visited by over 76,000 people from more than 30 countries. DJ Fresh, Dubioza Kolektiv, DJ Marky, Eyesburn, Modestep and many others have on numerous occasions praised Revolution.

Location 
Revolution took place on three stages in Timișoara, with some of the world's most popular music acts, alongside local talents.

History by years

Revolution 2015 
The inaugural installment of Revolution took place 30–31 May. It was attended by 12,000 people.

The headlining acts for Revolution 2015 included Noisia, DJ Fresh, Sabaton and many more.

Revolution Festival presented a combination of various live and electronic acts, ranging from famous drum and bass and house acts to metal and rock music.

Revolution 2016 
Revolution 2016 took place 1–3 June. It was attended by 19,000 people.

The headlining acts for Revolution 2016 included Juliette and the Licks, Skunk Anansie, John Digweed, Maxim, Suicidal Tendencies and many more.

Revolution Festival presented a combination of various live and electronic acts, ranging from famous rock and metal acts to house, big beat and punk music.

Revolution 2017 
Revolution 2017 took place 3–4 June. It was attended by 20,000 people.

The headlining act for Revolution 2017 included Rudimental, Sigala, Eluveitie, LTJ Bukem, Dubioza Kolektiv, Dubfire and many more.

Revolution Festival presented a combination of various live and electronic acts, ranging from famous drum and bass and house acts to metal, hardcore, rock and techno music.

Revolution 2018 
Revolution 2018 took place 31 May–1 June. It was attended by 25,000 people.

The headlining acts for Revolution 2018 included Gogol Bordello, Dub FX, Wilkinson and many more.

Revolution Festival presented a combination of various live and electronic acts, ranging from famous rock and dub acts to drum and bass and big beat music.

Revolution 2019 
Revolution 2019 took in August for the first time. It lasted from 8 to 10 August The number of attendees is yet to be released.

The headlining acts for Revolution 2019 included Kosheen, Unkle and many more.

Revolution Festival presented a combination of various live and electronic acts, ranging from famous trip hop acts to electronica music.

Key Venues

Music Guru 
Music Guru stage was the festival's main venue. It mainly hosted electronic acts, and has hosted some of the most influential DJs and producers in the world, such as Noisia, DJ Fresh, Modestep, DJ Marky, Stamina MC, John Digweed, Maxim, Rudimental, Sigala, LTJ Bukem, Dubfire, Dub FX, Wilkinson, Kosheen, Unkle and many more.

Electric Apex 
Electric Apex stage was focused on hosting local and regional electronic artists.

XTreme Zone 
XTreme Zone was a stage which mainly hosts rock and metal acts, and has hosted some of the most influential bands in the region and world, such as Sabaton, Dubioza Kolektiv, Eyesburn, Partibrejkers, Juliette and the Licks, Skunk Anansie, Suicidal Tendencies, Gogol Bordello, Eluveitie and many more.

Festival by year

References 

Music festivals in Romania